Gilgai is a town in the Northern Tablelands region of New South Wales, Australia The village is situated 10 km south of Inverell, New South Wales on Thunderbolts Way and is in Inverell Shire. At the 2006 census, Gilgai had a population of 289 people. The name Gilgai is an Aboriginal word meaning 'waterhole'.

The area around Gilgai is dotted with mine shafts that are unique in Australia. They are known as 'concertina shafts' because the seams of tin bearing ore were in a zigzag pattern and were mined accordingly. The precious stones found here include sapphires, rubies and some diamonds.

Wine grapes were grown here in 1849 by Charles Wyndham and re-introduced in 1968. Agriculture is the main industry in the area with beef cattle production and wine the main products. Gilgai has a public school which was built in 1878 from bricks baked on the site. There is also a general store, rural supplies store, Anglican Church, Salvation Army 
Church, community hall and tennis complex. Gilgai Post Office opened on 16 November 1879.

References

 "Inverell Shire Information", c.1981

Towns in New South Wales
Towns in New England (New South Wales)
Inverell Shire